Derek is a masculine given name. It is the English language short form of Diederik, the Low Franconian form of the name Theodoric. Theodoric is an old Germanic name with an original meaning of "people-ruler".

Common variants of the name are Derrek, Derick, Dereck, Derrick, and Deric. Low German and Dutch short forms of Diederik are Dik, Dirck, and Dirk.

History
 

The English form of the name arises in the 15th century, via import from the Low Countries. The native English (Anglo-Saxon) form of the name was Deoric or Deodric, from Old English Þēodrīc, but this name had fallen out of use in the medieval period. During the Late Middle Ages, there was intense contact between the territories adjacent to the North Sea, in particular due to the activities of the Hanseatic League. As a result, there was a lot of cross-pollination between Low German, Dutch, English, Danish and Norwegian. The given name Derk is found in records of the Low Countries from the early 14th century, and in the spelling Derck becomes rather common in name lists compiled in the Habsburg Netherlands during the early 16th century. An early bearer of the name Derek was lord of Keppel, Gelderland, in the early 14th century. A Derek van Keppel, lord of Verwoelde, died in 1495 and was succeeded by his eldest son, also called Derek van Keppel. A later Derek van Keppel died in 1646, succeeded by Asewolt van Keppel, the father of Arnold van Keppel, who in 1688 was created Earl of Albemarle in the Peerage of England.

Given name

Arts and entertainment

A–M

Derek Acorah (1950–2020), British TV personality
Derek Almstead (born 1974), musician/engineer
Derek and the Dominos (active 1970–1971), blues-rock group
 Derek Andersen, one half of the DJ duo SLANDER
Derek Bailey (guitarist) (1930–2005), jazz guitarist
 Derek Barbosa (born 1971), a.k.a. Chino XL, American rapper
Derek Batey (1928–2013), British TV presenter
Derek Bell (musician) (1935–2002), Irish harpist and composer
Derek Benfield (1926–2009), British actor and playwright
Derek Bermel (born 1967), American composer, clarinetist and conductor
Derek Michael Besant (born 1950), Canadian artist
Derek Bloom (born 1983), drummer of From First to Last
 Derek Bogaerde, birth name of Dirk Bogarde (1921–1999), British actor of Dutch/Scottish ancestry
 Derek Boland (1965-2009), a.k.a. Derek B, British DJ and rapper
Derek Bond (1920–2006), actor, director and playwright
Derek Boshier (born 1937), British pop artist
Derek Bourgeois (1941–2017), English composer
Derek Brockway (born 1967), Welsh meteorologist and TV presenter
Derek Buckner, American realistic painter
Derek Cecil (born 1973), American actor
Derek Charke (born 1974), Canadian composer and flutist
Derek de Lint (born 1950), Dutch actor
Derek Deadman (1940–2014), British actor
 Derek Dick (born 1958), a.k.a. Fish, Scottish progressive rock singer/songwriter
Derek Dingle (1937–2004), English close-up magician who lived in New York
Derek Drymon (born 1965), American writer and storyboard artist
Derek Edwards (born 1958), Canadian stand-up comedian and actor
Derek Elphinstone (1913–1999), British actor
Derek Erdman (born 1973), American artist
 Derek Floyd, American artist, brother of Cyndi Floyd, together performing as Philly sound duo Derek & Cyndi
Derek Forbes (born 1956), Scottish bassist
Derek Ford (1932–1995), English film director/writer
Derek Fordjour (born 1974), artist/painter and documentary producer
Derek Fowlds (1937–2020), English actor
Derek Francis (1923–1984), British comedy and character actor
Derek Fudesco, bassist and vocalist with indie rock band Pretty Girls Make Graves
Derek Gledhill, American drummer member of alternative rock/post-grunge music group Smile Empty Soul
Derek Grant (drummer) (born 1977), drummer for punk band Alkaline Trio
Derek Griffiths (born 1946), British actor
Derek Guille (born 1951), Australian radio presenter
Derek Hammond-Stroud (1926–2012), English opera singer
Derek Hanjora (born 1981), American Podcast Host
Derek Hartley (born 1969), American radio talk-show host
Derek Harvie (born 1971), Canadian entertainment writer and producer, living in the U.S.
Derek Hess, American poster and album-cover artist
Derek Hill (painter) (1916–2000), English portrait and landscape painter
Derek R. Hill, film production designer
Derek Hough (born 1985), American dancer, choreographer, musician and actor
Derek Jacobi (born 1938), English actor and director
Derek Jarman (1942–1994), English film director, stage designer, artist and writer
 Derek, a stage name, along with Johnny Cymbal, of Scottish-born American songwriter, singer and record producer born John Hendry Blair (1945–1993) 
Derek Kirk Kim (born 1974), American cartoonist
Derek Kok (born 1964), Hong Kong actor
Derek Lamb (1936–2005), American animation film-maker and producer
Derek Leckenby (1943–1994), English musician and guitarist, member of Herman's Hermits
Derek Longmuir (born 1951), drummer with the Bay City Rollers
Derek Luke (born 1974), American actor
Derek Ma (born 1990), Professor in natural hazards and humanitarian engineering 
Derek Malcolm (born 1932), British film critic
Derek Martin (born 1933), English actor
Derek McCulloch (1897–1967), BBC radio presenter and producer
Derek McGrath (born 1951), Canadian actor
Derek Meddings (1931–1995), British TV and cinema special effects expert
Derek Mooney (born 1967), Irish radio and TV personality and producer
Derek Morgan (Criminal Minds), fictional character 
Derek Murphy (musician), American drummer and session musician
 Derek X, a stage name, along with Sadat X, of American rapper Derek Murphy (born 1968)

N–Z

Derek Newark (1933–1998), English actor
Derek Nimmo (1930–1999), English character actor
Derek O'Brien (drummer) (born 1963), drummer and music producer
Derek Oldham (1887–1968), English tenor
Derek Paravicini (born 1979), English blind autistic savant and musical prodigy
Derek Pascoe (born 1957), American vocalist
Derek Pressnall, guitarist for the indie-pop group Tilly and the Wall
Derek Prince (1915–2003), American Christian radio preacher
Derek Lee Ragin (born 1958), American singer
Derek Richardson (actor) (born 1976), American actor
Derek Riggs (born 1958), British artist
Derek Riordan (born 1983), Scottish footballer (striker)
Derek Rodier (born 1959), Scottish footballer
Derek Roy (born 1983), Canadian ice hockey player
Derek Royle (1929–1990), English actor
Derek Sanderson (born 1946), Canadian ice hockey player and business executive
Derek Saunders (1928–2018), English footballer
Derek Sealy (1912–1982), West Indian cricketer
Derek Shackleton (1924–2007), English cricketer
Derek Shaw (businessman), English football club chairman
Derek Sherinian (born 1966), American keyboard musician, composer and producer
Derek Shulman (born 1947), Scottish singer/instrumentalist and record executive
Derek Smart, controversial designer of video games
Derek Smethurst (born 1948), South African footballer, author and sports consultant
Derek Smith (basketball), (1961–1996), American basketball player
Derek Smith (ice hockey born 1954), Canadian ice hockey player
Derek Smith (ice hockey born 1984), Canadian ice hockey player
Derek Smith (linebacker) (born 1975), American football player
Derek Smith (Tight End) (born 1980), American football player
 Derek Smith (born 1979), a.k.a. Pretty Lights, American electronic musician
Derek Soutar (born 1981), Scottish football goalkeeper
Derek St. Holmes (born 1953), rock musician
Derek Stephen Prince (born 1969), American voice actor and radio host
Derek Stillie (born 1973), Scottish football goalkeeper
Derek Stirling (born 1961), New Zealand cricketer
Derek Strong (born 1968), American basketball player and racing driver
Derek Tapscott (1932–2008), Welsh footballer
Derek Taylor, Canadian news anchor and sportscaster
Derek Temple (born 1938), English footballer
Derek Thompson (actor) (born 1948), Northern Irish TV actor
 Derek Thompson, a.k.a. Hoodlum Priest, musician and record producer and engineer
Derek Tracey (born 1971), Irish footballer
Derek Trent (born 1980), American ice skater (pairs)
Derek Trucks (born 1979), American blues-rock guitarist
Derek Turner (1932–2015), rugby league footballer
Derek Ufton (1928–2021), English cricketer
Derek Underwood (born 1945), English cricketer
Derek Varnals (born 1935), South African cricketer
Derek Wadsworth (1939–2008), British composer and arranger
Derek Warfield (born 1943), Irish singer/songwriter and historian
Derek Waring, born Derek Barton-Chapple (1927–2007), English actor
Derek Warwick (born 1954), English F1 racing car driver
Derek Waters (born 1979), American actor, comedian, screenwriter, producer and director
Derek Webb (born 1974), American singer-songwriter
Derek Whitehead (born 1944), English rugby league footballer 
Derek Whyte (born 1968), Scottish footballer
Derek Woodcock, Australian rules football field umpire
Derek Yee (born 1957), Hong Kong film director
Derek Young (born 1921), American drummer from a band "Queen"
Derek Yu (born 1982), American independent game designer, video game artist, and blogger

Sports

A–M

Derek Abney (born 1980), American football wide receiver
Derek Anderson (American football) (born 1983), National Football League quarterback
Derek Anderson (basketball) (born 1974), American basketball player
Derek Armstrong (ice hockey) (born 1973), Canadian hockey player
Derek Asamoah (born 1981), Ghanaian footballer playing in Korea
Derek Barnett (born 1996), American football player
Derek Bell (auto racer) (born 1941), British F1 racing car driver
Derek Bell (baseball) (born 1968), American former Major League Baseball player
Derek Bell (footballer, born 1956), English football player
Derek Bell (footballer, born 1963), English football player
Derek Bellotti (born 1946), English football player
Derek Boateng (born 1983), Ghanaian footballer
Derek Boogaard (1982–2011), Canadian ice hockey player
Derek Bryant (boxer) (born 1971), American heavyweight boxer
Derek Campbell (born 1980), Canadian ice hockey player
Derek Campos (born 1988), American mixed martial artist
Derek Carr (born 1991), American football player
Derek Cassidy (born 1986), American football player
Derek Chisora (born 1983), British heavyweight boxer
Derek Clayton (born 1942), British/Australian long-distance runner
Derek Collins (born 1969), Scottish footballer and football coach
Derek Combs (born 1979), American football player 	
Derek Cooke (born 1991), basketball player for Hapoel Gilboa Galil of the Israeli Basketball Premier League
Derek Couch, a.k.a. Robbie McAllister, Scottish member of Canadian tag wrestling team The Highlanders
Derek Cox (born 1986), American football player
Derek Crookes (born 1969), South African cricketer
Derek Curry (born 1981), American football player
Derek Daly (born 1953), Irish F1 racing car driver
Derek Darnell Brown (born 1971), American football player
Derek Dawkins (born 1959), English professional footballer
Derek de Boorder (born 1985), New Zealand cricketer
Derek Dennis (born 1988), American football player
Derek Dooley (American football coach) (born 1968), American football player and coach
Derek Dooley (footballer) (1929–2008), English footballer, manager and club chairman
Derek Dougan (1938–2007), Northern Irish footballer and club chairman
Derek Edwards (rugby league) (died 2020), rugby league footballer
Derek Fazackerley (born 1951), English footballer and coach
Derek Ferguson (born 1967), Scottish footballer and club manager
Derek Fisher (born 1974), American basketball player
Derek Geary (born 1980), Irish footballer who played in England
Derek Grimm (born 1974), American basketball player
Derek Hagan (born 1984), American football player (wide receiver)
Derek Hales (born 1951), English footballer
Derek Hall (cricketer) (1932–1983), English cricketer
Derek Hallas (born c. 1934), English rugby union and rugby league footballer
Derek Hardiman (born 1981), Irish hurling player
Derek Harper (born 1961), American basketball player and TV sports anchor
Derek Hawksworth (born 1927), English footballer
Derek Heasley (born 1972), Irish cricketer
Derek Higgins (born 1966), Irish Indy Lights racing car driver
Derek Hill (driver) (born 1975), American former Formula 3000 driver
Derek Ho (1964–2020), American surfer
Derek Holland (born 1986), American baseball player
Derek Holmes (born 1978), Scottish footballer
Derek Hood (basketball) (born 1976), American basketball player
Derek Howes, rugby league footballer
Derek Ibbotson (1932–2017), English track athlete
Derek Jeter (born 1974), American baseball player
Derek Johnson (athlete) (1933–2004), British track athlete
Derek Johnstone (born 1953), Scottish footballer
Derek Joslin (born 1987), Canadian ice hockey player
Derek Keenan (born 1961), Canadian lacrosse player
Derek Kenway (born 1978), English cricketer
Derek Kevan (1935–2013), English footballer
Derek King (born 1967), Canadian ice hockey player
Derek Lilley (born 1974), Scottish footballer
Derek Lilliquist (born 1966) American baseball player and coach
Derek Lowe (born 1973), American baseball player
Derek Lyle (born 1981), Scottish footballer
Derek Lyng (born 1978), Irish hurling player
Derek MacKenzie (born 1981), Canadian ice hockey player
Derek Malawsky (born 1973), Canadian lacrosse player
Derek McInnes (born 1971), Scottish footballer
Derek Meech (born 1984), Canadian ice hockey player
Derek Miles (born 1972), American pole vaulter
Derek Mills (born 1972), American track athlete
Derek Morgan (1929–2017), English cricketer
Derek Morris (ice hockey) (born 1978), Canadian ice hockey player
Derek Mountfield (born 1962), English footballer
Derek Murray (Gaelic footballer), Irish Gaelic footballer

N–Z

Derek Niven (born 1983), Scottish footballer
Derek Noonan (1947–2009), rugby union and rugby league footballer
Derek Norris (born 1989), American baseball player
Derek Oldbury a.k.a. DEO (1924–1994), British draughts champion and writer on the game
Derek Pace (1932–1989), English footballer
Derek Parker (footballer) (1926–2011), English footballer
Derek Parkin (born 1948), English footballer
Derek Parlane (born 1953), Scottish footballer
Derek Parra (born 1970), Mexican-American speed skater (ice)
Derek Perera (born 1977), Sri Lankan Canadian cricketer
Derek Phillips (footballer, born 1975) (born 1975), Trinidad and Tobago footballer
Derek Piggott (1922–2019), British glider pilot
Derek Plante (born 1971), American ice hockey player
Derek Popovich (born 1981), American footballer
Derek Porter (born 1967), Canadian rower
Derek Poundstone (born 1981), American professional strongman
Derek Pringle (born 1958), English cricketer and cricket journalist
Derek Quinnell (born 1949), Welsh rugby union player
Derek Rackley (born 1977), American football player
Derek Rae (born 1967), Scottish soccer commentator
Derek Randall (born 1951), English cricketer
Derek Redmond (born 1965), English track athlete
Derek Reeves (1934–1995), English footballer
Derek Ringer (born 1956), Scottish rally driver
Derek Riordan (born 1983), Scottish footballer
Derek Rivers (born 1994), American football player
Derek Rodier (born 1959), Scottish footballer
Derek Roy (born 1983), Canadian ice hockey player
Derek Sanderson (born 1946), Canadian ice hockey player and business executive
Derek Saunders (1928–2018), English footballer
Derek Sealy (1912–1982), West Indian cricketer
Derek Shackleton (1924–2007), English cricketer
Derek Shaw (businessman), English football club chairman
Derek Smethurst (born 1948), South African footballer, author and sports consultant
Derek Smith (basketball), (1961–1996), American basketball player
Derek Smith (ice hockey born 1954), Canadian ice hockey player
Derek Smith (ice hockey born 1984), Canadian ice hockey player
Derek Smith (linebacker) (born 1975), American football player
Derek Smith (tight end) (born 1980), American football player
Derek Soutar (born 1981), Scottish football goalkeeper
Derek Stillie (born 1973), Scottish football goalkeeper
Derek Stingley (born 1971), American football player
Derek Stingley Jr. (born 2001), American football player
Derek Stirling (born 1961), New Zealand cricketer
Derek Strong (born 1968), American basketball player and racing driver
Derek Tapscott (1932–2008), Welsh footballer
Derek Temple (born 1938), English footballer
Derek Tracey (born 1971), Irish footballer
Derek Trent (born 1980), American pairs ice skater
Derek Turner (1932–2015), rugby league footballer
Derek Ufton (born 1928), English cricketer
Derek Underwood (born 1945), English cricketer
Derek Varnals (born 1935), South African cricketer
Derek Warwick (born 1954), English F1 racing car driver
Derek Whitehead (born 1944), rugby league footballer
Derek Whyte (born 1968), Scottish footballer
Derek Woodcock, Australian rules football field umpire

Business 
Derek Burney Jr. (born 1962), Canadian corporate senior executive
Derek Lambie (born 1975), Scottish newspaper editor
Derek V. Smith, American business executive

Politics 

Derek Barber, Baron Barber of Tewkesbury (1918–2017), British civil servant, agricultural expert and politician
Derek Beackon, English lorry driver and politician
Derek Bedson (1920–1989), Canadian civil servant
Derek Blackburn (1934–2017), Canadian politician
Derek Brownlee (born 1974), Scottish politician
Derek Bryan (1910–2003), British diplomat
Derek Burney (born 1939), Canadian businessman, diplomat and political strategist
Derek Clark (born 1933), British politician and science teacher
Derek Conway (born 1953), British politician
Derek Coombs (1937–2014), British politician and corporate executive
Derek Corrigan, Canadian politician
Derek Croxton, American history researcher and writer
Derek Draper (born 1967), English former lobbyist involved in Cash for Access scandal in 1999, subsequently a psychotherapist
Derek Enright (1935–1995), British politician
Derek Ezra, Baron Ezra (1919–2015) British politician and corporate executive
Derek Fatchett (1945–1999), British politician
Derek Fletcher (born 1951), Canadian politician born in England
Derek Foster, Baron Foster of Bishop Auckland (1937–2019), British politician
Derek Freeman (1916–2001), New Zealand anthropologist
Derek Gregory (born 1951), British geographer
Derek Hatton (born 1948), English politician, businessman and after-dinner speaker
Derek Holland (activist), British politician and writer who uses several pen-names: Harry Worthington, Rory O'Connor, D. Liam O'Huallachain, Derek O'Huallachain, and Deric O'Huallachain
Derek Humphry (born 1930), writer of the suicide handbook Final Exit and president of the Euthanasia Research & Guidance Organization
Derek Hussey (born 1948), Northern Irish politician
Derek Keppel (1863–1944), British nobleman, soldier and member of the royal household
Derek Laud (born 1964), English political lobbyist
Derek Lee (politician) (born 1948), Canadian lawyer and politician
Derek Lodge (1929–1996), English civil servant and statistician
Derek Mackay (born 1977), Scottish politician
Derek McDowell (born 1958), Irish politician
Derek Mooney (born 1962), Irish ministerial adviser and [(Fianna Fáil)] campaign manager
Derek Moore-Brabazon, 2nd Baron Brabazon of Tara (1910–1974)
Derek Morris (academic) (born 1945), British academic, formerly chairperson of the Competition Commission
Derek Oulton (1927–2016), lawyer and civil servant
Derek Page, Baron Whaddon (1927–2005), British politician
Derek Prag (1923–2010), British politician
Derek Quigley (born 1932), New Zealand politician
Derek Robinson (trade unionist) (1927–2017), British motor industry shop steward a.k.a. "Red Robbo"
Derek Schofield (born 1945), Chief Justice of Gibraltar
Derek Simpson (trade unionist) (born 1944), British trade unionist
Derek Spencer (born 1936), British politician
Derek Hugh Taylor (born 1951), Chief Minister of the Turks and Caicos Islands from 1995 to 2003
Derek Twigg (born 1959) English politician
Derek James Walding (1937–2007), Canadian politician, born in England
Derek Walker-Smith, Baron Broxbourne (1910–1992), British politician
Derek Wall, British politician
 Derek Watkins, British docker shop steward, member of the Pentonville Five
 "Derek Wee", name used in a controversial blog by Wee Siew Kim (born 1960), Singaporean politician
Derek Wells (born 1946), Canadian politician and lawyer
Derek Worlock (1920–1996), British Roman Catholic bishop
Derek Wyatt (born 1949), British politician

Science, education and academics 

Derek Abbott (born 1960), physicist and electronic engineer
Derek Barton (1918–1998), British physical chemist and Nobel Prize laureate
Derek Bickerton (1926–2018), linguist and academic
Derek Birley (1926–2002), academic and educator
Derek Blake, academic and research scientist
Derek Bok (born 1930), American lawyer and educator
Derek Briggs (born 1950), Irish paleontologist
Derek Denny-Brown (1901–1981), British neurologist
Derek Denton (1924–2022), Australian scientist
Derek Hirst (born 1948), English historian of early-modern Britain
Derek Hockridge (1934–2013), British translator, lecturer and expert in French society and culture
Derek Hopwood (1933–2020), British academic and author
Derek Long (born 1925), former professor of structural chemistry at the University of Bradford, working in the field of Raman spectroscopy
Derek McCormack, New Zealand biochemist and academic
Derek Wragge Morley (1920–1969) independent science consultant and journalist noted for study of ants
Derek Parfit (1942–2017), British philosopher and academic
Derek J. de Solla Price (1922–1983), information scientist and science historian
Derek Ratcliffe (1929–2005), British nature conservationist
Derek Roe (1937–2014), British paleolithic archeologist and academic
Derek Summerfield, controversial psychiatrist and writer
Derek Taunt (1917–2004), British mathematician and codebreaker
Derek van der Kooy (born 1952), scientist and academic working in stem cell research

Writing 

Derek Beaulieu (born 1973), Canadian poet, publisher and anthologist
Derek Benz (born 1971), American author of children's fantasy
Derek Hansen (born 1944), New Zealand/Australia fiction writer, born in England
Derek Jameson (1929–2012), British journalist
Derek Landy (born 1974), Irish author and screenwriter
Derek Mahon (1941–2020), Irish poet
Derek Marlowe (1938–1996), English playwright, novelist and screenwriter
Derek McCormack (born 1969), Canadian fiction writer
Derek Parker (born 1932), British writer and broadcaster
Derek Raymond (1931–1994), English noir writer
Derek Robinson (novelist) (born 1932), British military aviation novelist and pilot
Derek Tangye (1912–1996), English author
Derek Taylor (1932–1997), British journalist and press agent for The Beatles
Derek Turner (journalist) (born 1964), Irish journalist
Derek Walcott (1930–2017), West Indian poet, playwright, writer and visual artist
Derek Wood (author) (1930–2003), author of Jane's World Aircraft Recognition Handbook

Miscellaneous 
Derek Bentley (1933–1953), Englishman hanged for murder and subsequently pardoned
Derek Chauvin (born 1976), American former police officer convicted in the murder of George Floyd
Derek Anthony Seagrim (1903–1943), English soldier and recipient of the Victoria Cross
Derek Watson (priest) (born 1938), British retired churchman, former Dean of Salisbury in the Church of England
 Derek Wood (c. 1964 – 1988), one of two British soldiers killed in the 1988 Corporals killings incident

Spelling variants

 Derrek
Derrek Konrad (born 1943), Canadian politician
Derrek Lee (born 1975), American former baseball player
Derrek Tuszka (born 1997), American football player

 Derrick
Derrick (name)

 Derick
Derick (name)

 Deryck
Deryck Guyler (1914–1999), English actor
Deryck Whibley (born 1980), Canadian singer-songwriter

Fictional characters 

Derek and Clive, controversial cult characters portrayed by Dudley Moore and Peter Cook
Derek the dark green diesel, character from Thomas the Tank Engine
Derek the Sheep, eponymous character in a comic strip in the Beano
Derek Almond, character in the graphic novel V for Vendetta
Derek Blunt, anthropomorphic hawk in Darkwing Duck
Derek Branning, character in the BBC soap EastEnders
Derek Conway, character in British TV series The Bill
Derek Faye, character in The Catherine Tate Show who appears to be in denial about his sexuality
 Derek Flint, eponymous character in Our Man Flint
Derek Frye, character in the ABC soap opera All My Children
 Derek Generic, character from the animated series Bobby's World.
Derek Harkinson, character in the BBC soap EastEnders
Derek Hale, character in MTV's Teen Wolf played by Tyler Hoechlin
Derek Klivian, pilot in the Rogue Squadron from Star Wars
Derek Morgan, character in the criminal drama series Criminal Minds played by Shemar Moore
Derek Noakes, eponymous character in the comedy-drama pilot Derek
Derek O'Farrell, character in the British soap Brookside
Derek Powers a.k.a. Blight, supervillain in the animated series Batman Beyond
Derek Shepherd former Head of Neurosurgery at Grey-Sloan Memorial Hospital, in the American medical series Grey's Anatomy
Derek Smalls, character in the spoof rockumentary This Is Spinal Tap
Derek Stiles, character in the Trauma Center series of video games
 Derek Taylor, a character in the American TV sitcom Silver Spoons
Derek Trotter, character in the TV comedy series Only Fools and Horses
Derek Vinyard, character in the American crime drama film American History X
Derek Venturi, title character in the Canadian TV show Life with Derek
Derek Wakaluk, a character played by Will Sasso in the Canadian teen drama television series Madison
Derek Wheeler a.k.a. "Wheels", character in the Degrassi series
Derek Wildstar, character in the TV series Star Blazers
Derek Wilton, character in the TV soap Coronation Street
 Derek Zoolander, eponymous character in the film Zoolander
Derek (The Good Place character), character in The Good Place
 Derek Lucks, former head of TASCorp, inventor of the Meta Runner arm and overall antagonist of season 1 and 2 of the Meta Runner internet series. He was shot in the head by Masa (under the control of Dr. Sheridan) in the last episode of season 2.
 Prince Derek, one of the main characters in the animated film The Swan Princess

Popularity 
Since 1940, the peak of the popularity of the name Derek in the United States was in the 1980s.

Rank 1 is the most popular, rank 2 is the next most popular, and so forth.

^ Rank > 1000

Source: Social Security Administration.

See also 
All pages beginning with Derek
Darrick
Derrick (disambiguation)

References

External links
 Behind the Name Article

English masculine given names
German masculine given names
Dutch masculine given names